Ernest Edwards may refer to:

Ernie Edwards (fl. 1892–1931), English professional footballer
Ernie Edwards (politician), (1912–1974), Australian politician
Ernest Edwards (journalist), Liverpool Echo sports editor who reported on 1900s association football events such as the naming of Spion Kop terrace